U.S. Route 164  may refer to:
U.S. Route 164 (Texas–Oklahoma) from Amarillo, Texas to Enid, Oklahoma; became part of US 60 in 1930
U.S. Route 164 (Arizona–Colorado) from near Tuba City, Arizona to Cortez, Colorado; became part of US 160 in about 1970

1
64-1